Gong Yuzhi (26 December 1929 – 12 June 2007) was a Chinese Communist Party theorist and politician. He was a representative of the 15th National Congress of the Communist Party of China. He was a member of the 5th, 6th, 7th, and 8th National Committee of the Chinese People's Political Consultative Conference and a member of the 9th Standing Committee of the Chinese People's Political Consultative Conference.

Biography
Gong was born in Xiangtan, Hunan, on 26 December 1929, while his ancestral home in Changsha County. His father Gong Yinbing was a communist revolutionary and politician. In September 1948, he was admitted to Tsinghua University, majoring in chemistry. He joined the Chinese Communist Party in December 1948. 

Gong worked in the Publicity Department of the Chinese Communist Party after university. In 1966, Mao Zedong launched the Cultural Revolution, he was sent to the May Seventh Cadre Schools to do farm works in Helan County, northwest China's Ningxia Hui Autonomous Region. He was reinstated in October 1973 and worked at the Science and Education Group of the State Council and Ministry of Education. In early 1977, he and Zheng Bijian jointly drafted an editorial entitled "Learning Documents Well and Grasping the Outline", which officially put forward the "Two Whatevers". In January 1980, he served as deputy director of the Office of Chairman Mao Zedong's Works Editorial Committee of the CPC Central Committee and deputy head of the Party Documents Research Office of the CPC Central Committee. In March 1988, he was appointed deputy head of the Publicity Department of the Chinese Communist Party, responsible for theoretical work. In March 1994, he became vice president of the Central Party School of the Chinese Communist Party, concurrently serving as executive deputy head of the Party Documents Research Office of the CPC Central Committee since June 1995.

On 12 June 2007, he died from an illness in Beijing, aged 77.

References

1929 births
2007 deaths
People from Xiangtan
Tsinghua University alumni
People's Republic of China politicians from Hunan
Chinese Communist Party politicians from Hunan
Members of the 5th Chinese People's Political Consultative Conference
Members of the 6th Chinese People's Political Consultative Conference
Members of the 7th Chinese People's Political Consultative Conference
Members of the 8th Chinese People's Political Consultative Conference
Members of the Standing Committee of the 9th Chinese People's Political Consultative Conference